David (Dudi) Tiram (born 16 September 1993) is an Israeli footballer who plays for Hapoel Ramat HaSharon.

Career
Tiram started playing youth football with Hapoel Pardesyia, and moved to Maccabi Netanya in 2006. In 2013, Tiram graduated to the senior team, and was loaned to F.C. Kafr Qasim and Maccabi Kiryat Gat to gain some playing time and hands-on experience.

At the beginning of the 2015–16 season, Tiram returned to Maccabi Netanya, and made his senior debut with the club On 22 August 2015, against Maccabi Petah Tikva. A day later, Tiram transferred to Hapoel Ra'anana, with which he made his debut on 29 August 2015.

In the 2016–17 season he played for Hapoel Ramat Gan in Liga Leumit and had a remarkable season with the club. In July 2017 Dudi left Hapoel Ramat Gan and returned to play for Maccabi Netanya.

On 28 June 2019, Tiram signed a two-years contract with Romanian club Astra Giurgiu.

References

1993 births
Living people
Israeli Jews
Israeli footballers
Footballers from Central District (Israel)
Maccabi Netanya F.C. players
F.C. Kafr Qasim players
Maccabi Kiryat Gat F.C. players
Hapoel Ra'anana A.F.C. players
Hapoel Ramat Gan F.C. players
FC Astra Giurgiu players
F.C. Ashdod players
Hapoel Nir Ramat HaSharon F.C. players
Liga Leumit players
Liga I players
Israeli Premier League players
Israeli expatriate footballers
Expatriate footballers in Romania
Israeli expatriate sportspeople in Romania
People from Pardesiya
Association football central defenders